Expedito Alencar (born 24 February 1946) is a Brazilian boxer. He competed in the men's welterweight event at the 1968 Summer Olympics.

References

External links
 

1946 births
Living people
Brazilian male boxers
Olympic boxers of Brazil
Boxers at the 1968 Summer Olympics
Sportspeople from Ceará
Welterweight boxers